Acraea vumbui, the Vumba acraea, is a butterfly in the family Nymphalidae. It is found in eastern Zimbabwe. The habitat consists of forests.

Adults are on wing year round, but peaks occur in late summer.

The larvae feed on Urera hypselodendron.

It is a member of the Acraea circeis species group - but see also Pierre & Bernaud, 2014  (new synonym of Acraea conradti kuekenthali Le Doux, 1922)

References

Butterflies described in 1934
vumbui
Endemic fauna of Zimbabwe
Butterflies of Africa